Swing Out, Sister is a 1945 American musical comedy film directed by Edward C. Lilley and starring Arthur Treacher, Rod Cameron and Billie Burke. The screenplay concerns two people who get jobs anonymously at a jazz club without telling their upper-class families.

Cast
 Rod Cameron as Geoffrey Cabot
 Billie Burke as Jessica Mariman
 Arthur Treacher as Chumley
 Frances Raeburn as Penelope Mariman / "Donna Leslie"
 Jacqueline deWit as Pat Cameron
 Samuel S. Hinds as Rufus Mariman
 Fuzzy Knight as Clutch
 Milburn Stone as Tim Colby

Cultural reference
The English pop duo Swing Out Sister took its name from the film.

External links 
 Synopsis and commentary at The New York Times
 
 
 

1945 films
1945 musical comedy films
1945 romantic comedy films
American musical comedy films
American romantic comedy films
American romantic musical films
American black-and-white films
Films set in New York City
Universal Pictures films
1940s romantic musical films
1940s English-language films
Films directed by Edward C. Lilley
1940s American films